The IRB International U21 Player of the Year was awarded by the International Rugby Board (now World Rugby) in the autumn each year from 2001 to 2006. In 2008, it was combined with the IRB International U19 Player of the Year to create the IRB Junior Player of the Year award.

List of winners

List of other IRB Awards 
 World Rugby Player of the Year
 World Rugby Team of the Year 
 World Rugby Coach of the Year 
 IRB International U19 Player of the Year
 IRB International Sevens Team of the Year
 World Rugby Sevens Player of the Year
 Spirit of Rugby Award
 Vernon Pugh Award for Distinguished Service 
 IRB Referee Award for Distinguished Service
 IRB International Women's Personality of the Year
 IRB Development Award 
 IRB Chairman's Award

External links
 Official website

Players